This article lists players who have recently captained the Laois county hurling team in the Leinster Senior Hurling Championship and the All-Ireland Senior Hurling Championship.

List of captains

Hurlers
+Captains
Laois